Mário Zavaterník (born 21 April 1978 in Lučenec) is a Slovak football defender.

References

External links

1978 births
Living people
Slovak footballers
Association football defenders
FK Dukla Banská Bystrica players
MŠK Púchov players
FK Inter Bratislava players
FK Senica players
Slovak Super Liga players
People from Lučenec
Sportspeople from the Banská Bystrica Region